Mystery Tracks – Archives Vol. 3 is the 12th studio album released by guitarist Steve Vai. It is the third in a series of discs collecting unreleased tracks, demo recordings and other bits. The track Speeding is a playable song in Guitar Hero: Warriors of Rock, although it is a re-recording.
This Is Volume 4 in "The Secret Jewel Box".

Track listing

Personnel
Steve Vai – guitar, tambourine, sampler
Devin Townsend – vocals
T.M. Stevens – bass
Mike Keneally – guitar, keyboards
Marc Ziegenhagen – keyboards
Robin DiMaggio – drums, drum programming
Deen Castronovo – drums
Morgan Ågren – drums
Jonathan Haas – percussion

References

2003 compilation albums
Steve Vai albums
Heavy metal compilation albums
Instrumental rock compilation albums
Hard rock compilation albums
Favored Nations compilation albums